Kosmos 1629 ( meaning Cosmos 1629) is a Soviet US-KS missile early warning satellite which was launched in 1985 as part of the Oko programme. The satellite is designed to identify missile launches using optical telescopes and infrared sensors.

Kosmos 1629 was launched from Site 200/39 at Baikonur Cosmodrome in the Kazakh SSR. A Proton-K carrier rocket with a DM upper stage was used to perform the launch, which took place at 07:57 UTC on 21 February 1985. The launch successfully placed the satellite into geostationary orbit. It subsequently received its Kosmos designation, and the international designator 1985-016A. The United States Space Command assigned it the Satellite Catalog Number 15574.

It was operational for about 2 years.

See also

List of Kosmos satellites (1501–1750)

References

1985 in spaceflight
Spacecraft launched by Proton rockets
Kosmos satellites
Oko
1985 in the Soviet Union
Spacecraft launched in 1985